Microsoft Compiled HTML Help is a Microsoft proprietary online help format, consisting of a collection of HTML pages, an index and other navigation tools. The files are compressed and deployed in a binary format with the extension .CHM, for Compiled HTML. The format is often used for software documentation.

It was introduced as the successor to Microsoft WinHelp with the release of Windows 95 OSR 2.5 and consequently, Windows 98. Within the Windows NT family, the CHM file support is introduced in Windows NT 4.0 and is still supported in Windows 11. Although the format was designed by Microsoft, it has been successfully reverse-engineered and is now supported in many document viewer applications.

History

Microsoft has announced that they do not intend to add any new features to HTML Help.

File format
Help is delivered as a binary file with the .chm extension. It contains a set of HTML files, a hyperlinked table of contents, and an index file. The file format has been reverse-engineered and documentation of it is freely available.

The file starts with bytes "ITSF" (in ASCII), for "Info-Tech Storage Format", which is the internal name given by Microsoft to the generic storage file format used in with CHM files.

CHM files support the following features:
 Data compression (using LZX)
 Built-in search engine
 Ability to merge multiple .chm help files
 Extended character support, although it does not fully support Unicode.

Use in Windows applications
The Microsoft Reader's .lit file format is a modification of the HTML Help CHM format. CHM files are sometimes used for e-books.

Sumatra PDF supports viewing CHM documents since version 1.9.

Various applications, such as HTML Help Workshop and 7-Zip can decompile CHM files. The hh.exe utility on Windows and the extract_chmLib utility (a component of chmlib) on Linux can also decompile CHM files.

Microsoft's HTML Help Workshop and Compiler generate CHM files by instructions stored in a HTML Help project. The file name of such a project has the extension .HHP and the file is just a text with the INI file format.

The Free Pascal project has a compiler (chmcmd) that can create CHM files in a multiplatform way.

Use in non-Windows applications
Read support:
 GTK: , CHMsee, chmviewkit
 Qt: Okular, kchmviewer, 
 Java: 
 iOS: CHMate Neue, iChm, ChmPlus, ReadCHM
 Android: KingReader, Chm Reader, iReader
 Mac OS X: iChm (Discontinued), ChmPlus (Discontinued), CHMox(PowerPC apps no longer supported), ArCHMock (Discontinued), CHM to EPUB (Discontinued), Clearview Reader
 Other / Cross-platform: xCHM, DisplayCHM
 Amiga: libmspack on Aminet

Read/write support:
 Lazarus (IDE)/Free Pascal (for a doxygen like tool, a separate commandline compiler in 2.6.0+, and a simple viewer in Lazarus)

See also

 Windows Help
 Microsoft Help 2
 Comparison of documentation generators

References

External links
 HTML Help Web Page on MSDN
 Microsoft Help 2 Reference (part of Visual Studio SDK for VS7.1 and VS8.0)
 History of HTML Help
 Unofficial (Preliminary) HTML Help Specification (the linked ITSF specification has been moved to the Russotto.net domain)

Internet Explorer
Technical communication
Online help